Charles Klein was a playwright and actor.

Charles Klein  may also refer to:

Charles H. Klein (1872-1961), American businessman and politician
Chuck Klein, baseball outfielder
Charles Klein (golfer) in Oklahoma Open

See also
Charles H. Kline, mayor of Pittsburgh, 1925-1933
Charles Cline (disambiguation)